Benny Farm is a residential development in the Notre-Dame-de-Grâce district of Montreal, originally developed in the late 1940s by the Government of Canada for returning veterans of the Second World War and their families. In 2010, the area was official renamed as Aire Benny  by the borough of Côte-des-Neiges–Notre-Dame-de-Grâce.

These initial apartment buildings units were maintained by the Department of Veterans Affairs, then later by the Canada Mortgage and Housing Corporation (CMHC).

In 1997, the Canada Lands Company and CMHC added four new apartment buildings to provide modern and accessible homes for veterans, their families and new tenants who had previously lived in original Benny Farm units. These additions were part of CLC's larger redevelopment project for the Benny Farm property, which added approximately 570 new and refurbished housing units and two new community service buildings. In 2002, the architectural firms of Saia and Barbarese and Laverdière + Giguère received the Governor General's Medal for Architecture for their work in developing the buildings and landscaping.

In 2007, the CLC sold these properties to the Office municipal d'habitation de Montréal.

References

External links
CLSC De Benny Farm
Benny Farm – Z.O.O. Non-profit Housing Cooperative
Immeubles Benny Farm on Office municipal d'habitation de Montréal

Public housing in Canada
Neighbourhoods in Montreal
Côte-des-Neiges–Notre-Dame-de-Grâce